Immortalized is the sixth solo studio album by American rapper Spice 1. It was released on October 12, 1999 through Jive Records. Recording sessions took place at the Cosmic Slop Shop in Fairfield, at Battery Studios, Sound On Sound and Unique Recording in New York, at Infinite Studios in Alameda, at S&A Studios, at DaMo Muzik Works, and at Make Tracks Studios in Modesto. Production was handled by Rick Rock, Kirk Crumpler, Dave Mezee, Grand Exultant, Mo' Benjamin and Tony Harmon, with Scott Gordon and Spice 1 serving as executive producers. It features guest appearances from N.O.R.E., Den Fen, Half a Mill, Ike Dirty, Roger Troutman, Saafir, Spook Thee Man, Too Short, Young Kyoz and Yukmouth. The album peaked at number 111 on the Billboard 200 and number 30 on the Top R&B Albums in the United States.

Track listing

Sample credits
Track 6 contains a sample from Ice Cube's "You Can't Fade Me", which also contains a sample from Parliament's "Rumpofsteelskin"
Track 9 contains a sample from "Sunny Monday" written by Booker T. & the M.G.'s
Track 21 contains a portion of the Ginuwine's composition "Tell Me Do U Wanna"

Charts

References

External links

1999 albums
Spice 1 albums
Jive Records albums
Albums produced by Rick Rock